Lakhan may refer to:

 Lakhan, Uttar Pradesh, a village in Muzaffarnagar district
 Lakhan (film), a 1979 Hindi film